Ambriz Airport  is an airport serving Ambriz, Angola.

The Ambriz non-directional beacon is north of the airfield.

See also

 List of airports in Angola
 Transport in Angola

References

External links 
OpenStreetMap - Ambriz
OurAirports - Ambriz

Airports in Angola